The opponens digiti minimi (opponens digiti quinti in older texts) is a muscle in the hand. It is of a triangular form, and placed immediately beneath the palmaris brevis, abductor digiti minimi and flexor digiti minimi brevis. It is one of the three hypothenar muscles that control the little finger.

It arises from the convexity of the hamulus of the hamate bone and the contiguous portion of the transverse carpal ligament; it is inserted into the whole length of the metacarpal bone of the little finger, along its ulnar margin.

The opponens digiti minimi muscle serves to flex and laterally rotate the 5th metacarpal about the 5th carpometacarpal joint, as when bringing the little finger and thumb into opposition. It is innervated by the deep branch of the ulnar nerve.

See also
 Hypothenar
 Opponens pollicis muscle

Additional images

References

External links
 PTCentral

Muscles of the upper limb